Pasadur  is a small coastal village in southern Croatia. It is located on the northwestern shore of the island of Lastovo and the eastern shore of the nearby isle of Prežba, the islands being connected by a small bridge. Administratively it belongs to the Lastovo municipality, which is in turn part of the Dubrovnik-Neretva County.

Gallery

References

Populated places in Dubrovnik-Neretva County
Populated coastal places in Croatia
Lastovo